Maurizio Calvesi (born 1954) is an Italian cinematographer. 

Born in Rome, Calvesi began his career in 1977 as a camera operator before debuting as cinematographer in 1990. In 1992 he won a special Ciak d'oro for his work in Aurelio Grimaldi's Acla's Descent into Floristella. In 2003 Calvesi won the Golden Pegasus at the  Flaiano Film Festival for his work in Roberto Faenza's The Soul Keeper. He won the Nastro d'Argento for best cinematography twice, in 2007 for Roberto Andò's Secret Journey and in 2010 for Ferzan Özpetek's Loose Cannons. He also won two Globi d'oro (Italian Golden Globes), in 2007 for Mohsen Melliti's I, the Other and in 2008 for Faenza's I Vicerè.

Selected filmography 

 Volevo i pantaloni (1990)
 Acla's Descent into Floristella (1992)
 Vietato ai minori  (1992)
 The Rebel (1993)
 The Whores  (1994)
 OcchioPinocchio  (1994)
 A Cold, Cold Winter (1996)
 Nerolio (1996)
 Giovani e belli   (1996)
 Kaputt Mundi (1998) 
 The Scent of the Night (1998) 
 I Love Andrea (2000)
 Ginostra  (2002)
 The Soul Keeper (2002)
 Forever (2003)
 Strange Crime (2004)
 Shadows in the Sun (2005)
 I giorni dell'abbandono  (2005)
 Secret Journey (2006)
 I, the Other (2006)
 I Vicerè (2007)
 The Case of Unfaithful Klara (2009)
 Tutti al mare  (2011)
 Someday This Pain Will Be Useful to You (2011)
 Magnificent Presence (2012)
 Cherry on the Cake (2012)
 Viva la libertà  (2013)
 Amiche da morire  (2013)
 The Confessions (2016)

References

External links 
 

1954 births
Film people from Rome
Italian cinematographers
Living people
Nastro d'Argento winners